Mount Pleasant Community High School is a public high school (grades 9–12) located in Mount Pleasant, Iowa.  MPCHS is one   of two high schools in the Mount Pleasant Community School District.  Annual enrollments are generally between 600 and 700 students for all four grade levels.  The school offers regular and enriched academic education which includes advanced placement classes, special education classes, vocational education, and specialized instruction for at-risk students as well as those with limited English-speaking capabilities.

Athletics
The high school is part of the 3A Southeast Conference and participates in 18 varsity athletics, including track and field, cross country, basketball, football, wrestling, volleyball, soccer, tennis, golf, and bowling (added in 2010).

State Championships
MPCHS holds eight state championships, three in boys basketball (1917,1918, 2012), one in boys outdoor track & field (2000), girls cross country (2002) and three in girls track & field (2004, 2005, 2006). The football team was also voted state champions (for all classes) in 1963 (before there was a playoff system) as they were undefeated and unscored on.

Activities
The school's music program allows students to participate in choir, show choir, concert band, marching band, and jazz band.  The Mount Pleasant Panther Marching Band, since 1986 has accumulated an impressive streak of consecutive Division I ratings at the annual State Marching Band Festival. The band hosts their own marching band invitational, usually held on the third Saturday evening in September.

The Mount Pleasant Community High School currently has two jazz bands. The Mount Pleasant Jazz 1 has qualified numerous times for the State Jazz Championships over the years. Jazz 2 is composed mainly of underclassmen.

The Mount Pleasant InMotion show choir is an ensemble directed by Marlene DePriest. The school hosts their own show choir invitational, Music in Motion, annually in early February.

Notable alumni 
 Henry Krieger-Coble, former collegiate football player for the University of Iowa Hawkeyes, and NFL tight end. 
 James Van Allen, physicist that discovered the Van Allen Radiation Belts.
 Leonard Wester, NFL player

See also
List of school districts in Iowa
List of high schools in Iowa

References

External links
 K-12 School District Music Website

Educational institutions in the United States with year of establishment missing
Buildings and structures in Mount Pleasant, Iowa
Schools in Henry County, Iowa
Public high schools in Iowa